Thomas Owen Rice (born December 9, 1960) is a United States district judge of the United States District Court for the Eastern District of Washington.

Early life and education 

Born in Spokane, Washington, Rice earned a Bachelor of Business Administration degree from Gonzaga University in 1983 and a Juris Doctor from Gonzaga University School of Law in 1986.

Professional career 

From 1986 until early 1987, Rice worked for the United States Department of Justice as a trial attorney in Washington in the department's tax division. From 1987 to 2012, Rice worked in the United States Attorney's Office for the Eastern District of Washington. He was an Assistant United States Attorney from 1987 to 2012. He served as the deputy criminal chief for his prosecutor's office from 2000 until 2003, and then was the criminal chief from 2003 until 2006. From 2006 until his appointment to the bench, he was a First Assistant United States Attorney.

Federal judicial service 

On June 29, 2011, President Obama nominated Rice to the seat on the United States District Court for the Eastern District of Washington that had been vacated by Judge Robert H. Whaley, who took senior status in 2009. He received a hearing before the Senate Judiciary Committee on September 20, 2011, and his nomination was reported to the floor of the Senate by voice vote on October 13, 2011. On March 6, 2012, the United States Senate confirmed Rice's nomination in a 93–4 vote. He received his commission on March 8, 2012. Rice served as Chief Judge of the court from January 27, 2016 to July 24, 2020.

References

External links

1960 births
Living people
Assistant United States Attorneys
Gonzaga University School of Law alumni
Gonzaga University alumni
Judges of the United States District Court for the Eastern District of Washington
Lawyers from Spokane, Washington
United States district court judges appointed by Barack Obama
21st-century American judges